Players name marked in bold have been capped at full international level.

Group A

Brazil
Manager:  Caio Zanardi

Colombia 
Manager:  Juan Camilo Pérez

Paraguay 
Manager:  Carlos Jara Saguier

Peru 
Manager:  Juan José Oré

Venezuela 
Manager:  Ceferino Bencomo

Group B

Argentina 
Manager:  Miguel Ángel Lemme

Bolivia 
Manager:  Claudio Chacior

Chile 
Manager:  Alfredo Grelak

Ecuador 
Manager:  Javier Rodríguez

Uruguay 
Manager:  Santiago Ostolaza

References

External links 
 Official squads 

South American Under-17 Football Championship squads